Teonimanu is a former island in the Solomon Islands; it was located south of Ulawa and north of the Olu Malau (Three Sisters) Islands in what is now Makira-Ulawa Province. Lark Shoal is probably a remnant of the island. The Pagewa and Aiga Tatari clans of Owaraha and other nearby islands claim descent from the Teonimanu refugees. Local traditions tell of several other, smaller islands in the same vicinity, which may have collapsed during the same events.

References

Islands of the Solomon Islands
Former islands